Backnang – Schwäbisch Gmünd is an electoral constituency (German: Wahlkreis) represented in the Bundestag. It elects one member via first-past-the-post voting. Under the current constituency numbering system, it is designated as constituency 269. It is located in northeastern Baden-Württemberg, comprising the western part of the Ostalbkreis district and the northern part of the Rems-Murr-Kreis district.

Backnang – Schwäbisch Gmünd was created for the 1965 federal election. Since 2021, it has been represented by Ingeborg Gräßle of the Christian Democratic Union (CDU).

Geography
Backnang – Schwäbisch Gmünd is located in northeastern Baden-Württemberg. As of the 2021 federal election, it comprises the municipalities of Abtsgmünd, Bartholomä, Böbingen an der Rems, Durlangen, Eschach, Göggingen, Gschwend, Heubach, Heuchlingen, Iggingen, Leinzell, Lorch, Mögglingen, Mutlangen, Obergröningen, Ruppertshofen, Schechingen, Schwäbisch Gmünd, Spraitbach, Täferrot, and Waldstetten from the Ostalbkreis district and the municipalities of  Allmersbach im Tal, Althütte, Aspach, Auenwald, Backnang, Burgstetten, Großerlach, Kirchberg an der Murr, Murrhardt, Oppenweiler, Spiegelberg, Sulzbach an der Murr, and Weissach im Tal from the Rems-Murr-Kreis district.

History
Backnang – Schwäbisch Gmünd was created in 1965, then known as Schwäbisch Gmünd – Backnang. It acquired its current name in the 1980 election. In the 1965 through 1976 elections, it was constituency 175 in the numbering system. In the 1980 through 1998 elections, it was number 173. In the 2002 and 2005 elections, it was number 270. Since the 2009 election, it has been number 269.

Originally, the constituency comprised the districts of Schwäbisch Gmünd, Backnang, and Schwäbisch Hall. It acquired its current borders in the 1980 election.

Members
The constituency has been held continuously by the Christian Democratic Union (CDU) since its creation. It was first represented by Eugen Gerstenmaier from 1965 to 1969, followed by Dieter Schulte from 1969 to 1998, a total of eight consecutive terms. Norbert Barthle was representative from 1998 to 2021. He was succeeded by Ingeborg Gräßle in 2021.

Election results

2021 election

2017 election

2013 election

2009 election

References

Federal electoral districts in Baden-Württemberg
1965 establishments in West Germany
Constituencies established in 1965
Ostalbkreis
Rems-Murr-Kreis